Ervin's Rest (also known as the Louis Dargan Ervin House) is a historic site in American Beach, Florida. It is located at 5448 Gregg Street. On April 23, 1998, it was added to the U.S. National Register of Historic Places.

Gallery

References

 Nassau County listings at National Register of Historic Places
Plaque erected in front of home announcing it as a A Florida Heritage Site, Sponsored by the American Beach Prosperity Owners' Association, Inc., Friends of American Beach, Inc., and the Florida Department of State.

Houses on the National Register of Historic Places in Florida
Houses in Nassau County, Florida
National Register of Historic Places in Nassau County, Florida
Amelia Island